Joseph-Alexandre Mercier (3 December 1874 – 16 July 1935) was a Liberal party member of the House of Commons of Canada. He was born in Montreal, Quebec and became a lawyer.

Mercier attended St. Mary's College in Montreal, then earned his Bachelor of Arts degree at Université Laval.

He was first elected to Parliament at the Laurier—Outremont riding in the 1925 general election then re-elected in 1926 and 1930.

Mercier died on 16 July 1935 before he completed his term in the 17th Canadian Parliament.

References

External links
 

1874 births
1935 deaths
Lawyers from Montreal
Liberal Party of Canada MPs
Members of the House of Commons of Canada from Quebec
Politicians from Montreal